Steve Marlet (born 10 January 1974) is a French former professional footballer who played as a forward. He was capped 23 times and scored six goals for the France national team, winning the Confederations Cup in 2001 and 2003 and featuring at Euro 2004.

Early life
Marlet was born in Pithiviers, Loiret.

Club career

Early career
Marlet began his professional career with Red Star.

Fulham
Marlet held the record for Fulham's biggest transfer fee until July 2008, as the newly promoted Premier League team paid £11.5 million to sign him in August  2001 from Olympique Lyonnais. His expectations was well received by France national team coach Roger Lemerre, suggesting "He will progress at Fulham". However, he only managed 11 goals in 54 league games, as then-manager Jean Tigana was dismissed during the season. He played just one game in the 2003–04 season for Fulham, in which he scored. He was then loaned out to Olympique de Marseille  on 27 August, with an option to sign permanently.

While on loan, Marlet partnered Didier Drogba up front as Marseille advanced through the 2003-04 UEFA Cup, before losing the final to Valencia.

Marlet's poor performances for Fulham led to chairman Mohamed Al-Fayed taking Tigana to the Court of Arbitration for Sport for the high transfer fee.  Tigana, who had ties to Lyon and had briefly been Marlet's agent, was accused of signing him for an exorbitant fee and taking a cut of the fee for himself. The charges were quickly dropped.

Wolfsburg and Lorient
On 21 August 2005, after his release from Fulham, Marlet signed a one-year deal with the option for a second year,  at VfL Wolfsburg of the German Bundesliga. On his arrival, manager Thomas Strunz said "Steve Marlet is very well-known in international football, a player who is fast and versatile".
 
Marlet only scored one Bundesliga goal and was not given the second year of his contract. He trained for two weeks with Paris St. Germain before signing a one-year deal at FC Lorient, newly promoted to Ligue 1. He was attracted by the attacking style of manager Christian Gourcuff.

Later career
After being released by Lorient, he went on trial with Ipswich Town from 6 to 30 October 2007,  Chicago Fire and Reims.

In July 2011, he joined FC Red Star Saint-Ouen in the third tier of French football, the Championnat National, where he spent the last season of his career.

Career statistics

Club
Source:

International goals
Scores and results list France's goal tally first, score column indicates score after each Marlet goal.

Honours
Lyon
Coupe de la Ligue: 2000–01

Fulham
UEFA Intertoto Cup: 2002

References

External links

 
 Sporting-Heroes.net photos and stats

1974 births
Living people
People from Pithiviers
Sportspeople from Loiret
French footballers
France international footballers
Association football forwards
Association football wingers
Red Star F.C. players
AJ Auxerre players
Olympique Lyonnais players
Fulham F.C. players
Olympique de Marseille players
Premier League players
VfL Wolfsburg players
FC Lorient players
2001 FIFA Confederations Cup players
2003 FIFA Confederations Cup players
UEFA Euro 2004 players
FIFA Confederations Cup-winning players
French expatriate footballers
French people of Martiniquais descent
Ligue 1 players
Ligue 2 players
Bundesliga players
Expatriate footballers in England
Expatriate footballers in Germany
French expatriate sportspeople in England
French expatriate sportspeople in Germany
FCM Aubervilliers players
Black French sportspeople
Footballers from Centre-Val de Loire